South of Sanity is a 2012 British horror film directed, filmed, edited and produced by Kirk F. Watson and written and co-directed by Matthew Edwards, both of whom star in the film. The film was released on 31 October 2012 and is the first full-length fictional film to have been shot in Antarctica.

Plot
The film takes place in Antarctica, centering around a rescue team that was sent to the Routledge research station to investigate a research team's lack of communication with the outside world. Once there, the team discovers no survivors in the research station but finds a diary that describes the research team's last days. The diary goes over the research team's growing malcontent and paranoia as the team is picked off one by one by a mysterious killer.

Cast
 Mathew Edwards as Rob
 Kirk Watson as Gaz
 Melissa Langridge as Katrina
 Daniel Edmunds as Sam
 Matt Von Tersch as Frank
 Tony McLaughlan as Phil
 Shaun Scopes as Joe
 Riet Van de Velde as Luke
 James Wake as Nicolas
 Jonathon Yates as Doug
 Dave Routledge as Mike
 Mike Shortt
 Terri Souster as Sharon
 Paul Craske as Matt

Development
Watson began working on the film while working for the British Antarctic Survey, seeing the film as a way to pass time and "hone his film-making". Matt Edwards initially wrote the script as a short story, but chose to adapt it into a screenplay. Fellow staff members made up the cast and crew, with Edwards and Watson both starring in the film. The crew used a children's face painting kit for makeup and utilized food coloring and syrup for fake blood.

Reception
Joseph Wade of Something Awful panned the film, writing, "South of Sanity is packed to the gills with every slasher cliché in the book, and it rarely uses any of them well".

References

External links
 

2012 films
2012 horror films
British horror films
British slasher films
Films set in Antarctica
Films shot in Antarctica
2010s English-language films
2010s British films